Firuza Sharipova (born 29 August 1994) is a Kazakhstani professional boxer who held the WIBA lightweight title in 2019. As of December 2021, she is ranked number two in the world by the WBA.

Amateur boxing career 
Sharipova made her amateur boxing debut on 14 September 2011 where she was victorious against Mukasheva in Nur-Sultan (Astana), Kazakhstan for a quarterfinal tournament match.

Highlights 

 2012 Kazakh National Championships
 Finals: Defeated Aliya Abdraimova (13-8)
 2012 Asian Championships
 Semifinals: Lost to Erdenesop Uyanga (13-37)
 2012 World Championships
 Preliminaries (1/8): Lost to Patricia Berghult (11-24)
 2013 Kazakh National Championships
 Quarterfinals: Defeated Natalya Tarasenko (19-14)
 Semifinals: Defeated Gulzhan Ubbiniyazova (10-9)
 Finals: Defeated Zura Khusainova (17-15)
 2014 Kazakh National Championships
 Quarterfinals: Defeated Tansholpan Kanatayeva (TKO 2)
 Semifinals: Defeated Aliya Abdraimova (2-0)
 Finals: Lost to Gulzhan Ubbiniyazova (0-3)
 2015 Kazakh National Championships
 Quarterfinals: Lost to Aliya Abdraimova (1-2)
 2016 Kazakh National Championships
 Quarterfinals: Defeated Karina Ibragimova (3-0)
 Semifinals: Lost to Rimma Volosenko (1-2)

Professional boxing career

Early career 
Sharipova made her professional debut in 2016 in a losing effort against Sofya Ochigava by unanimous decision (UD) on 21 May 2016. 

In her second professional bout she faced Angela Cannizzaro in Spain on 30 July 2016 receiving her first victory by unanimous decision.

In her third professional bout she face Milena Matovic on 24 September 2016 scoring her first technical knockout (TKO) victory.

Sharipova received her first title opportunity facing for the vacant Women's International Boxing Association (IBA) World Lightweight Championship against Milena Koleva on 26 August 2017 where Sharipova successful won by unanimous decision.

She got another title opportunity facing for both the vacant World Boxing Council (WBC) Silver Super Featherweight Championship and the vacant IBA World Super Featherweight Championship against Djemilla Gontaruk on 30 December 2017 where she successfully won by unanimous decision.

Sharipova had earned herself another opportunity to face for the vacant IBA World Super Lightweight Championship against Happy Daudi on 22 August 2020 where she won the bout by TKO, 1:50 into the 5th round.

Sharipova vs. Taylor 
Sharipova was announced to be fighting undisputed lightweight champion Katie Taylor in Liverpool on 11 December 2021 making her United Kingdom debut. Taylor retained the WBA, WBC, IBF, WBO, and The Ring female lightweight titles in a 10 round bout against Sharipova by unanimous decision.

Professional boxing record

References

External links 
 
 www.tapology.com

1994 births
Living people
People from Taraz
Kazakhstani women boxers
Light-welterweight boxers
Super-featherweight boxers
Lightweight boxers
21st-century Kazakhstani women